Bogra Sadar Upazila is an upazila of Bogra District in the Division of Rajshahi, Bangladesh. Bogra Thana was established in 1821 and was converted into an upazila in 1983. The upazila takes its name from the district and the Bengali word sadar (headquarters). It is the subdistrict where the district headquarters, Bogra town, is located.

Geography
It borders Shibganj Upazila to the north, Gabtali Upazila to the east, Shajahanpur Upazila to the south, and Kahaloo Upazila to the west. The Karatoya River flows south through the upazila.

Demographics

According to the 2011 Bangladesh census, Bogra Sadar Upazila had 131,862 households and a population of 555,014, 63.1% of whom lived in urban areas. 8.4% of the population was under the age of 5. The literacy rate (age 7 and over) was 65.7%, compared to the national average of 51.8%.

The boundaries of the upazila were redrawn in 2003 to create a new upazila, Shajahanpur. The combined population of the two in 2011 was 844,818, a 21.7% increase from 2001.

Administration
Bogra Sadar Upazila is divided into Bogra Municipality and 11 union parishads: Erulia, Fapore, Gokul, Lahiri Para, Namuja, Nishindara, Noongola, Rajapur, Sekherkola, Shabgram, and Shakharia. The union parishads are subdivided into 92 mauzas and 122 villages.

Bogra Municipality is subdivided into 20 wards and 111 mahallas.

Education

There are 13 colleges in the upazila, most located in Bogra town. Those outside the town include Adarsha Mohabiddyalaya in Puran Bogra, Jahidur Rahman Women's College in Erulia, Govt. Shah Sultan College, Namuza Degree College in Namuja, and Noon Gola Degree College.

See also
Bogra town
Upazilas of Bangladesh
Districts of Bangladesh
Divisions of Bangladesh

References

External links

 Official website 

Upazilas of Bogra District